Raoul Dgvareli (born 9 January 1965) is a Tajikistani wrestler. He competed in the men's Greco-Roman 130 kg at the 1996 Summer Olympics.

References

External links

1965 births
Living people
Tajikistani male sport wrestlers
Olympic wrestlers of Tajikistan
Wrestlers at the 1996 Summer Olympics
Place of birth missing (living people)